Luzzi is an Italian surname. Notable people with the surname include:

 Don Luzzi (1935–2005), Canadian politician and professional football player
 Eric Luzzi, American soccer coach
 Federico Luzzi, Italian tennis player
 Mike Luzzi, American jockey

Italian-language surnames